Mauritia was a Precambrian microcontinent that was situated between India and Madagascar until their separation about 70 million years ago. Being initially attached to the Indian continent, Mauritia separated from it about 60 million years ago and further fragmented into a ribbon-like structure as the mid-ocean ridge jumped several times. The jumps of the mid-ocean ridge are thought to have been caused of its interaction with the Réunion hotspot as it passed under the West margin of the Indian continent and then under Mauritia. As of today, the fragments of Mauritia include the Laccadives–Maldives–Chagos Ridge, Nazareth Bank, the Saya de Malha Bank, and Hawkins Bank, as well as the islands of Réunion and Mauritius, where the continual crust is buried under basaltic lavas of the Réunion hotspot.

Evidence for Mauritia’s existence consists of detrital zircon found in rock (6-million-year-old trachyte) on Mauritius. Analyses of the zircon crystals produced dates between 660 and 1,970 million years and are considerably older than the 8.9-million-year-old basalt that constitutes the oldest formations on the island. The zircons are interpreted to have been brought up from buried continental crust as fragments entrained as xenocrysts within the basalt. Interpretation of a linear northwest–southeast gravity anomaly indicates the microcontinent may extend  from Seychelles to Mauritius roughly parallel to the Indian Ocean oceanic ridge.

See also

References

Continental fragments
Plateaus of the Indian Ocean
Historical continents
Volcanism of the Indian Ocean
Geography of Madagascar
Geography of Mauritius
Geography of Seychelles